Alessandro Ferrara (born 1953 in Trieste) is an Italian philosopher, currently professor of political philosophy at the University of Rome Tor Vergata and former president of the Italian Association for Political Philosophy. He also teaches legal theory at Luiss Guido Carli University in Rome.

Studies
Ferrara graduated in philosophy in Italy (1975) and later, as a Harkness Fellow, received his Ph.D. from the University of California, Berkeley (1984). He conducted post-doctoral research in Munich and Frankfurt with Jürgen Habermas as a Von Humboldt Fellow and later at Berkeley again (1989), leading to the publication of his first book, Modernity and Authenticity.

Academic life
Ferrara served as an assistant professor in sociology at the University of Rome "La Sapienza" between 1984 and 1998, then associate professor in sociology at the University of Parma between 1998 and 2002. Since 2002, Ferrara has been professor of political philosophy at the University of Rome "Tor Vergata".

Starting in 1991, Ferrara has been a co-director of the yearly conference Philosophy and Social Science, initially held within the Interuniversity Centre of Dubrovnik, but since 1993 relocated to Prague, under the auspices of the Institute of Philosophy of the Czech Academy of Science.

In 1990, he helped found the Seminario di Teoria Critica (Italy), and up to 2019 he served as a co-director. He also serves on the Advisory Board of the Association Reset – Dialogues of Civilizations. 

Ferrara is co-editor (with David Rasmussen) of the series Philosophy and Politics – Critical Explorations (Springer), and editorial consultant for a number of journals including Constellations, Philosophy and Social Criticism, Krisis, Balsa de la Medusa, Studies in Social & Political Thought, Berlin Journal of Critical Theory, and Symposion: Theoretical and Applied Inquiries in Philosophy and Social Sciences.

He has taught and lectured in various capacities in a number of universities and institutions, including Boston College, Harvard University, Columbia University, Rice University, Cardozo Law School, Yale University, New School for Social Research, University College London (UCL), Oxford University, the Chinese Academy of Social Science in Beijing, Sapienza University of Rome, the Hebrew University of Jerusalem, Bilgi University and Sehir University in Istanbul, the National University of Singapore, and the Universities of California (at Berkeley), Paris – Sorbonne, Madrid, Chicago, Potsdam, Amsterdam, Mexico City, Exeter, Manchester, Johannesburg, Rio de Janeiro, London, Exeter, Dublin, Belfast, Coimbra, Lisbon, Frankfurt, Copenhagen, Berne, Bordeaux, Barcelona, Kraków, Lyon III, Tilburg, Luxembourg, Mumbai, Indore, Porto Alegre, Campo Grande, Catholic University of Chile in Santiago.

Research
Ferrara's work revolves around an account of normativity centered on authenticity and exemplarity, which incorporates a reconstructed version of Kant's "reflective judgment" and is intended as an alternative both to proceduralist, neo-transcendental approaches to validity and to anti-normative, radical contextualism.

In Reflective Authenticity exemplary normativity is first outlined and in Justice and Judgment is developed in the direction of a political-philosophical notion of justice. In The Force of the Example, drawing on Kant's Critique of the Power of Judgment but also on Arendt, Rawls, Dworkin, and Habermas, Ferrara applies his view of exemplary validity to central themes of contemporary political philosophy, including public reason, human rights, radical evil, sovereignty, republicanism and liberalism, as well as religion in the public sphere.

In The Democratic Horizon. Hyperpluralism and the Renewal of Political Liberalism, Ferrara argues that Rawls's “political liberalism” needs to be updated in order to improve its traction in a historical context different from the original one. Four adjustments – conjectural arguments, an enriched notion of the democratic ethos, a decentering of it in several local varieties, as well as the remedial model of a multivariate democratic polity – are suggested in order to enable political liberalism to meet the challenge of hyperpluralism. The aesthetic sources of normativity investigated in Ferrara's earlier work — exemplarity, judgment, the normativity of identity — are added to the conceptual resources of a revisited political liberalism.

Books authored

 Sovereignty Across Generations. Constituent Power and Political Liberalism, Oxford, Oxford University Press, 2023
 with Frank I. Michelman, Legitimation by Constitution: A Dialogue on Political Liberalism, Oxford, Oxford University Press (Series: Constitutional Theory), 2021
 Rousseau and Critical Theory, Boston-Leiden, Brill, 2017
 The Democratic Horizon. Hyperpluralism and the Renewal of Political Liberalism, New York, Cambridge University Press, 2014 (transl. into Spanish)
Symposia on the book: 
“Liberalism between Politics and Epistemology: A Discussion of Alessandro Ferrara’s The Democratic Horizon: Hyperpluralism and the Renewal of Political Liberalism”, in Political Studies, 2016, pp. 1-23, (articles by M.Ivkovic, J.Loncar, S.Prodanovic, B.Simeunovic, reply by A.Ferrara);               
“Democracy in the Age of Hyperpluralism. Special Section on Alessandro Ferrara’s The Democratic Horizon: Hyperpluralism and the renewal of political liberalism”, in Philosophy and Social Criticism, 2016, Vol. 42 (7), pp. 635–706(articles by D.Rasmussen, F.Michelman, S.Benhabib, S.K.White, W.Scheuerman, A.S.Laden, reply by A.Ferrara); 
“The Prospect for Liberal-Democracy in Troubled Times. A Symposium on Alessandro Ferrara’s The Democratic Horizon”, the supplementary volume of Jura Gentium. Journal of Philosophy of International Law and Global Politics (2017), Vol. XIV, n. 1, edited by L.Marchettoni, pp. 1-132 (articles by D.Owen, M.Festenstein, L.Baccelli, D.A.García, M.Solinas, L.Marchettoni, I.Testa, reply by A.Ferrara)              
“Le sfide della democrazia e il liberalismo politico”, Comments on A.Ferrara, The Democratic Horizon, in Notizie di Politeia, XXXIII, 126, 2017, pp. 165-183 (articles by E.Biale, V.Ottonelli, M.Santambrogio, reply by A.Ferrara.
 The Force of the Example. Explorations in the Paradigm of Judgment, New York, Columbia University Press, 2008 (transl. into Italian and Spanish)
Symposia on the book: 
“Review Symposium on The Force of the Example” in Political Studies, 2009, pp. 1-16 (articles by D.Castiglione, J.Richardson, A.Schaap, C.Wagner, reply by A.Ferrara).  
“Validità esemplare, estetica e politica. Discutendo La forza dell'esempio di A.Ferrara” numero monografico di Jura Gentium. Journal of Philosophy of International Law and Global Politics, edited by L.Marchettoni articles by L.Baccelli, C.Bottici, L.Cortella, F.Crespi, E.Galeotti, T.Griffero, L.Marchettoni, M.Rosati, D.Santoro, reply by A.Ferrara) 
 Justice and Judgment. The Rise and the Prospect of the Judgment Model in Contemporary Political Philosophy, London, Sage, 1999 (transl. into Italian)
 Reflective Authenticity. Rethinking the Project of Modernity, London and New York, Routledge, 1998 (transl. into Italian and Spanish)
Symposium on the book:
“Symposium on Reflective Authenticity” in Philosophy and Social Criticism, 2004, 30, 1, pp. 5-24 (articles by Ch.Larmore, A.Honneth, reply by A.Ferrara). 
 Modernity and Authenticity. A Study of the Social and Ethical Thought of Jean-Jacques Rousseau, Albany, NY: SUNY Press, 1993 (transl. into Italian)

Edited volumes
with D.Rasmussen e V.Kaul, Communities and the Individual: Beyond the Liberal-Communitarian Divide, special issue of Philosophy and Social Criticism, 2021, Vol. 47, 4
with D.Rasmussen e V.Kaul, Sources of Democracy: Citizenship, Social Cohesion and Ethical Values, special issue of Philosophy and Social Criticism, 2020, Vol. 46, 5
with D.Rasmussen e V.Kaul, Fountainheads of Toleration – Forms of Pluralism in Empires, Republics, Democracies, special issue of Philosophy and Social Criticism, 2019, Vol. 45, 2
 with D.Rasmussen e V.Kaul, The Populist Upsurge and the Decline of Diversity Capital, special issue of  Philosophy and Social Criticism, 2018, Vol. 44, 4
 A.Ferrara (ed.), Prague: 25 Years of Critical Theory, special issue of Philosophy and Social Criticism, 2017, Vol. 43, 3, pp. 235–372.

Recent articles and book chapters
“Unconventional Adaptation and the Authenticity of a Constitution”, in R.Albert, Revolutionary Constitutionalism. Law, Legitimacy, Power (Oxford: Hart, 2020), 155-177.
“Debating exemplarity: The 'communis' in sensus communis“, in a special section with Lois McNay on "Exemplarity and Normativity: A Debate“, Philosophy and Social Criticism, 2019, Vol. 45,2, pp.146–158. 
“Deconstructing the deconstruction of the law: Reflections on Menke's «Law and violence»”, in D.Owen (ed.), Law and Violence. Christoph Menke in Dialogue, Manchester, Manchester University Press, 2018, pp. 112–136.
“Can political liberalism help us rescue «the people» from populism?“, in Philosophy and Social Criticism, 2018, Vol. 44,4, pp. 463–477.
“Exemplarity in the public realm”, in Law & Literature, 2017, pp. 1–13

References

External links
Centennial of John Rawls's birth -  The Revolution of "The Most Reasonable", 21/02/2021, Sambashàn, University of Mumbai, India 
Reset Dialogues: Venice 2019, Pluralism and Public Reason
How to Rescue 'The People' from Populism, Public Seminar, New School for Social Research, New York
Key-note Lecture on "Political Liberalism, Revisited: The Upsurge of Populism and How to Cope", Oxford, 2.6.2017
Symposium on The Democratic Horizon in Jura Gentium. Journal of Philosophy of International Law and Global Politics (2017)
Symposium on The Democratic Horizon in Philosophy and Social Criticism (2016)
Symposium on The Democratic Horizon in Political Studies (2016)
Symposium on The Force of the Example  in Jura Gentium. Journal of Philosophy of International Law and Global Politics (2009)
Symposium on The Force of the Example in Political Studies (2010)
Keynote lecture at University of Bern on "Rehabilitating Authenticity: why Agency, Self-Identity, and Community Presuppose Purposive Unity", March 2014
Entrevista para Herder Editorial sobre "El horizonte democratico", Barcelona, June 2014
Keynote lecture at the Universidade Rio Grande do Sul, Porto Alegre, on "Democracy in Transformation and the Promise of an Expanded Political Liberalism", November 2014
Lecture at the Institute for Philosophy and Social Theory on "Democracy Today and the Renewal of Political Liberalism", Belgrade, December 2014

21st-century Italian philosophers
Political philosophers
University of California, Berkeley alumni
Rice University staff
Columbia University staff
Harvard University staff
Living people
1953 births
Academic staff of the University of Rome Tor Vergata